Angelika Jakubowska (born 30 April 1989) is a model from Lubań, Poland who was crowned Miss Polonia 2008.  She was Poland's representative at Miss Universe 2009 and Miss International 2009. Were during 2008 in a short relationship with Swedish semi-proffesional fotball player Magnus ”Mankan” Andersson.   Jakubowska posed for Playboy Poland in September 2010.

References

External
Angelika Jakubowska profile on the Miss Universe website
Angelika Jakubowska at Playboy

1989 births
Living people
Polish beauty pageant winners
Miss Universe 2009 contestants
Polish female models
People from Lubań
Miss International 2009 delegates
Miss Polonia winners